Jennifer Croft is an American author, critic and translator who works from Polish, Ukrainian and Argentine Spanish. With the author Olga Tokarczuk, she was awarded the 2018 Man Booker International Prize for her translation of Flights. In 2020, she was awarded the William Saroyan International Prize for Writing for Homesick, which was originally written in Spanish in 2014 and was published in Argentina under its original title, Serpientes y escaleras.

Croft is the recipient of Guggenheim, Cullman, Fulbright, PEN, MacDowell, Fondation Jan Michalski, Yaddo, and National Endowment for the Arts grants and fellowships, as well as the inaugural Michael Henry Heim Prize for Translation and a Tin House Workshop Scholarship for Homesick. She holds a PhD from Northwestern University and an MFA from the University of Iowa.

She is a founding editor of The Buenos Aires Review and has published her own work and numerous translations in The New Yorker, The New York Times, The New York Review of Books, The Paris Review, The Los Angeles Review of Books, VICE, n+1, Electric Literature, Lit Hub, BOMB, Guernica, The New Republic, The Guardian, The Chicago Tribune, Granta, and elsewhere.

Croft translated Romina Paula's August (The Feminist Press, 2017), Federico Falco's A Perfect Cemetery (Charco Press, 2021), Pedro Mairal's The Woman from Uruguay (Bloomsbury Publishing, 2021), Tina Oziewicz's What Feelings Do When No One's Looking (Elsewhere Editions, 2022), Sylvia Molloy's Dislocations (Charco Press, 2022), and Sebastián Martínez Daniell's Two Sherpas (Charco Press, 2023). Her translation of Tokarczuk's Flights from Polish was published by Fitzcarraldo Editions in May 2017. Croft has also translated Tokarczuk's novel Księgi Jakubowe (The Books of Jacob), which won the Nike Award in 2015.

Croft has written about postcards, translation and exile, contemporary American fiction, and Tempelhof Airport. From 2021-2022 she was a Visiting Assistant Professor of Creative Writing at the University of Arkansas. As of 2023, she is Associate Professor of Creative Writing at the University of Tulsa. 

With her essay in The Guardian, "Why translators should be named on book covers," Croft launched the #TranslatorsOnTheCover campaign in cooperation with the Society of Authors and the author Mark Haddon. The campaign has raised awareness of the collaborative nature of translated literature by foregrounding the identity of the translator, who, Croft argues, is the person who writes every word of the translated work.

Education 

Croft grew up in Tulsa, Oklahoma, where she entered the University of Tulsa at age 15. After completing her BA at the University of Tulsa in 2001, she learned Polish at the University of Iowa, where she did her MFA in literary translation. She lived in Poland for two years on a Fulbright scholarship. As she said in one of her interviews, "Polish has always been more of an academic and professional connection for me, but I try to go back to Kraków or Warsaw at least once a year to maintain that connection". She learned her Spanish in Buenos Aires, Argentina, and says of her work translating Argentine Spanish,I only translate works from Spanish that were written by Argentine authors—there’s such great diversity among the different Spanishes, and I’ve always felt it’s really important to be fully familiar with all the little components of speech, the quotidian rhythms writers employ and depart from. It's important for me to be able to hear the tone of a sentence, picture the facial expression and gestures that would accompany it, in order to find a fitting rendition in English.Croft received a PhD in Comparative Literary Studies from Northwestern University.

Awards 
With the author Olga Tokarczuk, Croft won the 2018 Man Booker International Prize.

On being asked what drew her to the writer's work, Jennifer Croft has said,I stumbled upon Olga Tokarczuk’s first short-story collection, Playing Many Drums, in 2003 as I prepared for a Fulbright at the University of Warsaw, where I would continue to study literary translation. Right away I loved her soothing, nuanced style, but I think the thing that appealed to me most was her psychological acuity, her ability to distill the essence of a person—I say "person" since her characters are so alive it’s hard for me to call them characters—and set in motion relationships that might charm and shock us at the same time, all while feeling both familiar and fresh.On being asked specifically about the novel Flights, Croft said,Tokarczuk calls Flights a "constellation" novel, which partly means she brings lots of different ideas and stories and voices into relationship with one another via the lines the reader draws between them. This made the translation process both challenging and particularly delightful, since I was able to tap into a fresh subject every time I sat down to my computer. One minute I was worrying about the woman who flies back to Poland from New Zealand to kill a dying childhood friend; the next I was amused by the foibles of the Internet; the next I was rethinking my own approach to travel, or to my body. I could go on and on. I loved translating this book.

In March 2022, Croft's translation of Tokarczuk's The Books of Jacob was longlisted for the 2022 Man Booker International Prize. subsequently being shortlisted in April.

Croft received the 2020 William Saroyan Prize for her illustrated memoir Homesick. In 2022, she was also awarded a Guggenheim Fellowship for her novel Amadou, which is slated for publication by Bloomsbury on March 5, 2024. Her short story "Anaheim," published by The Kenyon Review, was nominated for a 2023 Pushcart Prize.

References 

American translators
International Booker Prize winners
Living people
Northwestern University alumni
Polish–English translators
Spanish–English translators
Ukrainian–English translators
University of Iowa alumni
Year of birth missing (living people)